Pontarddulais Rugby Football Club is a rugby union team from the town of Pontarddulais in Wales, UK. The club is a member of the Welsh Rugby Union and is a feeder club for the Ospreys.

The club is famous as the location for the recording in 1975 of We All Had Doctors' Papers, a live album by Welsh comedian and singer Max Boyce, the only comedy album ever to top the UK album charts.
 
Although rugby had been played in Pontarddulais before the club's formation, it was not until 22 September 1881 that the local inhabitants decided on creating an official rugby club. The fact that Pontarddulais have a formation date is fairly uncommon if not unique in Welsh rugby union clubs formed before World War I; as most other teams did not record the event. In the early 1890s the team played in a green strip but had changed to their present black and amber by the turn of the century.

Club honours

Welsh Rugby Union competitions
WRU Division Seven West 1999/2000 - Champions
WRU Division Six West 2000/01 - Champions
WRU Division Four West 2005/06 - Champions

West Wales Rugby Union competitions
The Presidents All Winners Cup: 1963–64, 1964–65, 1965–66, 1966–67 
The Challenge Cup:  1963–64, 1964–65, 1965–66, 1966–67
Championship Shield:  1963–64, 1968–69
Championship Cup:  1966–67, 1967–68
Union Eurof Davies Memorial Cup: 1962–63, 1963–64, 1965–66, 1966–67, 1967–68, 1968–69
Union District 'F' Sevens:  1986-87
Union Welsh Brewers Bowl:  1989-90

Glamorgan County competitions
Glamorgan County Silver Ball HB Trophy:  1999-2000

West Wales Rugby Union Competitions
The Presidents Cup: 1967–68, 1973–74
The Championship Shield: 1967–68, 1973–74
The Challenge Cup: 1964–65, 1968–69, 1973–74
Section A Winners: 1980-81
Section C Winners: 1988–89, 1990–91, 1992–93
Section D Winners: 1977-78
Union Alcoa Cup: 1977-78

Youth competition
Dyffryn Llwchwr Youth Rugby Union The Championship Cup 1958–59, 1959–60, 1960–61, 1961–62, 1962–63, 1967–68, 1968–69, 1972–73, 1974–75, 1975–76, 1983–84, 1984–85, 1985–86, 1986–87, 1987–88, 1988–89, 1992–93, 1993–94
Dyffryn Llwchwr Youth Rugby Union  Gwyn Williams Memorial Trophy 1967–68, 1968–69, 1972–73, 1973–74, 1975–76, 1983–84, 1984–85, 1985–86, 1986–87, 1987–88, 1992–93, 1993–94, 1999-00
Dyffryn Llwchwr Youth Rugby Union  Loughor Valley Sevens 1974–75, 1979–80, 1983–84, 1984–85, 1986–87, 1987–88, 1994–95
Dyffryn Llwchwr Youth Rugby Union  Dudley Williams Memorial Cup 1982–83, 1983–84, 1984–85, 1993–94
Swansea & District Junior Rugby Union Swansea Super 12's (Under 11's) Winners 2007-08

Notable former players
  David Onllwyn Brace (9 caps). 1956 - 1961.
  David Idwal Davies (1 cap). 1939.
 William Dillwyn Johnson (1 cap). 1953.
 Arthur Vaughan-Jones (3 Caps). 1932 - 1933.
 Derwyn Jones (19 caps). 1994 - 1996.
 James Lang (12 caps). 1931 - 1937.
 Gareth John Roberts (7 caps). 1985 - 1987.
 David John Thomas (10 caps). 1904 - 1912.
 Darril John Williams (1 cap). 1998.

References

Rugby clubs established in 1881
Welsh rugby union teams
Rugby union in Swansea
1881 establishments in Wales